Leinster is an Irish province.

Leinster may also refer to:

Places
 Leinster, Western Australia, a mining town
 Leinster Airport, Western Australia
 Leinster (Province of Canada electoral district)
 Leinster (European Parliament constituency), Ireland
 Mount Leinster, a mountain in Ireland

Sports
 Leinster Cricket Club
 Leinster Lightning, a cricket team
 Leinster Rugby, a rugby union team

Ships
  (1896), a ship
 , a ship
 , a ship, IMO 6902767, later renamed Innisfallen

Other uses
 Murray Leinster, pen name of American writer William F. Jenkins

See also

 
 
 Leicester (disambiguation)